Sergeant Hubert Hastings "Paddy" Adair (1917–6 November 1940) was a World War II Royal Air Force pilot during the Battle of Britain.

Early life
Adair was born in Norwich in 1917, the son of Robert and Elizabeth Adair, and was educated at the City of Norwich School.

Royal Air Force
Adair joined the Royal Air Force in 1936.  After completing his training he joined No. 88 Squadron RAF and flew the Fairey Battle aircraft during the Battle of France. Adair volunteered for Fighter Command. He converted to Hawker Hurricanes in August 1940 and joined No. 151 Squadron RAF at RAF Digby on 4 September 1940 and then was posted to No. 213 Squadron RAF at RAF Tangmere on 16 September 1940.

On 6 November 1940 Adair was killed in action over Southampton flying Hurricane AK-D (V7602). It is believed that he was shot down by Major Helmut Wick of JG 2. Adair was posted as "missing in action" and was presumed to have come down in the English Channel.

Later research found that Adair's Hurricane, V7602, crashed at Pigeon House Farm, Widley, Hampshire. When it was excavated on 6 October 1979, the pilot's remains were found and later sent to Portchester Crematorium for disposal.

Memorials
Adair is named on the Air Forces Memorial at Runnymede, Surrey, on panel 11.
A memorial plaque, situation on top of Portsdown Hill in Hampshire close to the believed site of Adair's crash. The plaque reads:
SGT. H.H. ADAIR IN HURRICANE AK-D-V7602 CRASHED NEAR HERE ON THE 6/11/1940 WHILST DEFENDING PORTSMOUTH. HE FOUGHT AGAINST SUPERIOR ODDS AND LOST HIS YOUNG LIFE SO THAT FUTURE GENERATIONS COULD ENJOY THEIRS.

References 

The Few
1940 deaths
1917 births
Politicians from Norwich
Royal Air Force pilots of World War II
Royal Air Force personnel killed in World War II
Aviators killed by being shot down
Royal Air Force airmen
British World War II fighter pilots
People educated at the City of Norwich School
Military personnel from Norwich